An English basement is an apartment (flat in UK English) on the lowest floor of a building, generally a townhouse or brownstone, which is partially below and partially above ground level and which has its own entrance separate from those of the rest of the building.

Realty
English basements are sometimes rented out separately from the main dwelling, either by a single landlord who owns both portions of the building or by a tenant of the building who sub-lets the English basement. English basements are most common in larger, older cities like London, Edinburgh, New York City, Boston, and Washington, D.C.

Phrase
In other cities, such as Chicago and San Francisco, this space is referred to as a "garden apartment". The phrase "English basement" is mostly an Americanism. In Québec, in both English and French, this space is known as a "demi sous-sol," literally a "half-basement." In the United Kingdom, this style of apartment is usually known as a "garden flat" so long as it connects to a rear garden; the level of the property is referred to as "lower ground". The origin of the term "English basement" dates back to at least the mid-19th century. The earliest citation in the OED is 1853 ("1853   N.Y. Daily Times 8 July 5/3 (advt.)    House for sale... A new three-story English basement house."). Some people refer to it as the "garden level". Building codes in most cities use neither of the phrases, stating that any floor partly below grade-level is simply a "basement" and a floor more than 50% below grade-level is a "cellar".

See also
Basement apartment

References

Apartment types